Eirwen  is a feminine given name.

Origin and meaning 
Eirwen is a Welsh feminine given name meaning "white/blessed snow" and derives from the Welsh words "Eira" (snow) and "Gwyn" (white, fair or blessed).

Notable People 

 , (1926–2014), Welsh broadcaster and BBC news presenter
 Eirwen Meiriona St John Williams Gwynn (1916–2007), Welsh nationalist, writer, teacher and physicist

Eurwen 
A variant is Eurwen meaning "white/blessed gold" deriving from the Welsh words "Aur" (gold) and "Gwyn" (white, fair, blessed).

Notable people with this name include:

 Kate Eurwen O'Toole (b.1960), British actress (daughter of Peter O'Toole and Siân Phillips),

See also 

 Eirwyn (masculine form)
 Euryn
 Euryn (given name)

References 

Feminine given names
Welsh feminine given names